Roderic Fitzgerald Teamer Jr. (born May 12, 1997) is an American football strong safety for the Las Vegas Raiders of the National Football League (NFL). He played college football at Tulane.

Early life and high school
Teamer was born and grew up in New Orleans, Louisiana and attended Brother Martin High School. He was named first team All-Metro and first team All-State as a senior after recording 116 tackles, two interceptions and a sack.

College career
Teamer played four seasons for the Tulane Green Wave. He became a starter at cornerback towards the end of his freshman season. He made 48 tackles (3.5 for loss) with two passes broken up, a blocked kick and a fumble recovery, which he returned 52 yards for a touchdown in his junior season. As a senior, Teamer finished second on the team with 72 tackles along with six passes broken up and an interception and was named second team All-American Athletic Conference. He finished his collegiate career with 197 tackles, 15 passes defensed, three interceptions and three sacks in 46 games played.

Professional career

Los Angeles Chargers
Teamer signed with the Los Angeles Chargers as an undrafted free agent on April 27, 2019. He made his NFL debut on September 22, 2019 against the Houston Texans, starting at strong safety and making seven tackles. Teamer recorded his first career interception on October 20, 2019 in a 20-23 loss to the Tennessee Titans, picking off a pass thrown by Ryan Tannehill.
In Week 8 against the Chicago Bears, Teamer recorded a team high 8 tackles and sacked quarterback Mitch Trubisky once in the 17–16 win. Teamer finished his rookie season with 40 tackles, one sack, two passes defended and one interception in seven games played (six starts).

On July 13, 2020, Teamer was suspended for the first four games of the 2020 NFL season for violating the NFL's policy on substance abuse. He was waived on August 1, 2020.

Indianapolis Colts
On January 10, 2021, Teamer signed a reserve/futures contract with the Indianapolis Colts. He was waived on May 14, 2021.

Las Vegas Raiders
Teamer signed with the Las Vegas Raiders on June 3, 2021. He was placed on injured reserve on October 20, 2021. He was activated on November 20. 
In Week 12 against the Dallas Cowboys Teamer was ejected by the game for a fight on the sideline with Kelvin Joseph. Teamer finished his season playing in 10 games (two starts), recording 18 tackles.

In 2022 Teamer appeared in all 17 games for the first time in his career, with three starts, and recording 35 tackles (23 solo).

On March 15, 2023, Teamer re-signed with the Raiders.

References

External links
Tulane Green Wave bio
Los Angeles Chargers bio

Living people
1997 births
African-American players of American football
American football defensive backs
Indianapolis Colts players
Las Vegas Raiders players
Los Angeles Chargers players
Players of American football from New Orleans
Tulane Green Wave football players
21st-century African-American sportspeople